Campylostemon is a genus of flowering plants belonging to the family Celastraceae.

Its native range is Western, Eastern and Southern Tropical Africa.

Species:

Campylostemon angolensis 
Campylostemon bequaertii 
Campylostemon danckelmannianus 
Campylostemon laurentii 
Campylostemon lindequistianus 
Campylostemon mitophorus 
Campylostemon warneckeanus

References

Celastraceae
Celastrales genera